Wilkes Land crater is an informal term that may apply to two separate cases of conjectured giant impact craters hidden beneath the ice cap of Wilkes Land, East Antarctica. These are separated below under the heading Wilkes Land anomaly and Wilkes Land mascon (mass concentration), based on terms used in their principal published reference sources.

Wilkes Land anomaly
A giant impact crater beneath the Wilkes Land ice sheet was first proposed by Richard A. Schmidt in 1962 on the basis of the seismic and gravity discovery of the feature made by the U.S. Victoria Land Traverse in 1959–60 (VLT), and the data provided to Schmidt by John G. Weihaupt, geophysicist of the VLT (Geophysical Studies in Victoria Land, Antarctica, Report No. 1, Geophysical and Polar Research Center, University of Wisconsin, 1–123).

Schmidt further considered the possibility that it might be the elusive source of the tektites of the Australasian strewnfield (which is only 790,000 years old).

The hypothesis was detailed in a paper by Weihaupt in 1976.

The claims were challenged by Charles R. Bentley in 1979. On the basis of a 2010 paper by Weihaupt et al., Bentley's challenge was proven to be incorrect, and the Earth Impact Database (Rajmon 2011) has now reclassified the Wilkes Land Anomaly from a "possible impact crater" to a "probable impact crater" on the basis of Weihaupt et al.'s paper. Several other potential impact crater sites have now been proposed by other investigators in the Ross Sea, West Antarctica, and the Weddell Sea.

Mass concentration

Due to the site's location beneath the Antarctic ice sheet, there are no direct samples to test for evidence of impact. There are alternative explanations for this mass concentration, such as formation by a mantle plume or other large-scale volcanic activity. If this feature really is an impact crater then, based on the size of the ring structure, it has been suggested by Frese's team that the impactor could have been four or five times wider than the Chicxulub impactor, which is believed to have caused the Cretaceous–Paleogene extinction event.

Because mass concentrations on Earth are expected to dissipate over time, Frese and his collaborators believe the structure must be less than 500 million years old and also note that it appears to have been disturbed by the rift valley that formed 100 million years ago, during the separation of Australia from the Gondwana supercontinent.

The researchers, therefore, speculate that the putative impact and associated crater may have contributed to this separation by weakening the earth's crust at this location. These bracketing dates also make it possible that the site could be associated with the Permian–Triassic extinction event. The Permian–Triassic extinction occurred 250 million years ago and is believed to be the largest extinction event since the origin of complex multicellular life.

Plate reconstructions for the Permian–Triassic boundary place the putative crater directly antipodal to the Siberian Traps, and Frese et al. (2009) use the controversial theory that impacts can trigger massive volcanism at their antipodes to bolster their impact crater theory. However, there are already other suggested candidates for giant impacts at the Permian–Triassic boundary, such as Bedout, off the northern coast of Western Australia, although all are equally contentious and it is currently under debate whether or not an impact played any role in this extinction.

The complete absence of a well-defined impact ejecta layer associated with the Permian–Triassic boundary at its outcrops within Victoria Land and the central Transantarctic Mountains argues against there having been any impact capable of creating a crater the size of the hypothesized Wilkes Land impact crater within Antarctica at the Permian–Triassic boundary. Nonetheless, according to Frese, recent studies in 2018 seem to sustain the impact origin of crater, and the event may be linked to the separation of Eastern Antarctica from southern Australia.

See also
Bedout
Chicxulub crater
Cretaceous–Paleogene extinction event
List of possible impact structures on Earth
Permian–Triassic extinction event
Siberian Traps
Vredefort impact structure

References

External links
 (2006)
Images of crater area via Ohio State University (archived from the original on 2017-06-12)
Giant Crater Found: Tied to Worst Mass Extinction Ever Robert Roy Britt (SPACE.com) 1 June 2006 6:07 p.m. ET
Does a giant crater lie beneath the Antarctic ice? Bibliotecapleyades.net, 2 June 2006.
Earth Impact Database

Impact craters of Antarctica
Extinction events
Possible impact craters on Earth
Prehistory of Antarctica
Wilkes Land